Douglas Harrington (born November 21, 1964) is an American former professional racing driver. He has raced in the NASCAR Nationwide Series and the Rolex 24, both for Rick Ware Racing.

Motorsports career results

NASCAR
(key) (Bold – Pole position awarded by qualifying time. Italics – Pole position earned by points standings or practice time. * – Most laps led.)

Nationwide Series

 Season still in progress
 Ineligible for series points

24 Hours of Daytona
(key)

References

External links
 

1964 births
NASCAR drivers
Living people
Racing drivers from Texas